Aberdeen Sports Ground is a rugby union and football sports ground situated at 108 Wong Chuk Hang Road, Aberdeen, Hong Kong. It is the home stadium of Hong Kong Premier League football club Southern and Global Rapid Rugby rugby union team South China Tigers.

Inside the stadium, there is one running track (6 lanes, 400m) and one natural grass pitch.

Aberdeen Sports Ground is also the venue for 30 Hour Famine in Hong Kong.

After successfully gaining the right to play in the 2012–13 season on 8 April 2012, Southern continued to use Aberdeen Sports Ground as their home ground in the First Division.

As a result of Typhoon Mangkhut in September 2018, Aberdeen Sports Ground's West stand and canopy were damaged and deemed unusable. In November, a temporary canopy was erected over the East stand in order to allow for the remainder of Southern's home matches to be played at the stadium.

On 21 June 2019, the Leisure and Cultural Services Department announced that renovation work had begun on the stadium and that the facility would be closed to the public until 31 March 2020.

References

External links

 Leisure and Cultural Services Department - Aberdeen Sports Ground 

Sports venues in Hong Kong
Football venues in Hong Kong
Athletics (track and field) venues in Hong Kong
Rugby union stadiums in Hong Kong
1971 establishments in Hong Kong
Aberdeen, Hong Kong
South China Tigers